Austin Studios is a  film and video production facility with 10,000 square feet (1,000 m2) of production office space and over 100,000 square feet (10,000 m2) of production space established in 2000. The space includes five production stages converted from airplane hangars, two production office buildings, and numerous onsite vendors including Chapman/Leonard, Mobile Production Services, and  Miscellaneous Rentals, among others.

Austin Studios is also home to the Austin Film Society main office.

Various studio films shot at Austin Studios include: Miss Congeniality, The New Guy, The Rookie, The Life of David Gale, 25th Hour, The Texas Chainsaw Massacre: The Beginning, Secondhand Lions, Star Trek, Spy Kids 3-D: Game Over, Man of the House, Friday Night Lights, The Adventures of Shark Boy and Lava Girl, The Wendell Baker Story, Idiocracy, A Scanner Darkly, Infamous, The Hitcher, The Return, Stop-Loss, Grind House, Machete Kills, and Alita: Battle Angel. Various TV shows, commercials and music videos have also been shot at the studios. The Flaming Lips video "Psychic Wall" from The SpongeBob SquarePants Movie was shot in one of the stages and shows a behind-the-scenes look at the hangars. Austin Studios is also the former home to the Thunderdome, headquarters and skating facility of the TXRD Lonestar Rollergirls, as seen in the A&E reality series Rollergirls.

In November 2012, the city of Austin voted in favor of Proposition 4, which allotted a $5 million bond to improving Austin Studios. Planned renovations include soundproofing the stages, climate control, and improving the digital infrastructure of the facilities.

Every year Austin Studios hosts Summer Camps, such as Sci-Fi, Horror and Stop Motion Animation.

In April 2014, Rooster Teeth Productions moved offices to Stage 5 and Bungalow A at Austin Studios.

References

External links
Austin Film Society : Austin Studios
Austin Studios' Facebook

Culture of Austin, Texas
American film studios
Television studios in the United States
2000 establishments in Texas
Entertainment companies established in 2000